The men's 5000 metres at the 2018 European Athletics Championships took place at the Olympic Stadium on 11 August.

Records

Schedule

Results

Final

References

5000 M
5000 metres at the European Athletics Championships